Frozen may refer to:

 the result of freezing
 a paralysis response in extreme cases of fear

Films 
 Frozen (1997 film), a film by Wang Xiaoshuai
 Frozen (2005 film), a film by Juliet McKoen
 Frozen (2007 film), a film by Shivajee Chandrabhushan
 Frozen (2010 American film), a thriller film by Adam Green
 Frozen (2010 Hong Kong film), a film by Derek Kwok
 Frozen (franchise), a Disney media franchise based on the 2013 film
 Frozen (2013 film), a Disney animated film inspired by Hans Christian Andersen's The Snow Queen
Frozen Fever (2015), a short sequel to the film Frozen (2013)
 Olaf's Frozen Adventure (2017), a featurette short sequel to the film Frozen (2013)
 Frozen II (2019), the sequel to the film Frozen (2013)
 Frozen (advertisement), a 2014 political advertisement

Music

Albums
 Frozen (album), by Sentenced, released in 1998
 Frozen (EP), an EP by Curve
 Frozen (soundtrack), from the 2013 Disney animated film of the same name

Songs
 "Frozen" (Delain song), from their 2006 album Lucidity
 "Frozen" (Lil Baby song), released in 2022
 "Frozen" (Madonna song), from her 1998 album Ray of Light
 "Frozen" (Tami Chynn song), released in 2008
 "Frozen" (Within Temptation song), from their 2007 album The Heart of Everything
 "Frozen", a song by All That Remains from Overcome (bonus track)
 "Frozen", a song by Celldweller from Celldweller
 "Frozen", a song by Dissection from The Somberlain
 "Frozen", a song by Loona yyxy from Beauty & the Beat
 "Frozen", a song by Nightrage from Descent into Chaos
 "Frozen", a song by Sanctuary from The Year the Sun Died
 "Frozen", a song by Skid Row from Subhuman Race
 "Frozen", a song by Theatre of Tragedy from Forever Is the World

Television 
 "Frozen" (House), a season episode 4 of House
 "Frozen" (Stargate SG-1), a season 6 episode of Stargate SG-1

Theatre 
 Frozen (musical), a Broadway musical based on the film Frozen (2013), opened in spring 2018
 Frozen (play), a 2004 stage play by Bryony Lavery
 Frozen – Live at the Hyperion, a 2016 musical stage play, inspired by the film Frozen (2013)

See also
 Freeze (disambiguation)
 Freezing (disambiguation)
 Frozen assets (disambiguation)
 Frozen Lake (Montana)